Perspectives on Cormac McCarthy is a 1999 collection of essays critiquing the works of Cormac McCarthy from his first novel, The Orchard Keeper, originally published in 1965, up through Cities of the Plain, published in 1998. Perspectives was edited by Edwin T. Arnold and Diane C Luce. Each editor contributed two essays apiece to the collection of eleven essays.  This book covers all of McCarthy's major works published at that time, with the exception of his 1994 drama The Stonemason. Perspectives was published in 1999 by  University Press of Mississippi.

Chapters
The introduction and first four chapters of Perspectives on Cormac McCarthy are provided below:

 "Introduction" by Edwin T. Arnold and Dianne C. Luce (pp.1–16)
 "Values and Structure in The Orchard Keeper" by David Paul Ragan (pp.17–28)
 "A Thing Against Which Time Will Not Prevail..." by John M. Grammerv (pp.29–44).
 "Naming, Knowing and Nothingness: McCarthy's Moral Parables" by Edwin T. Arnold (pp.45–70).
 "Cormac McCarthy's First Screenplay: 'The Gardener's Son'" by Dianne C. Luce (pp.71–96).

See also
Cormac McCarthy bibliography
List of awards received by Cormac McCarthy

References

External links 

A Cormac McCarthy Companion

Prospects for the Study of Cormac McCarthy

American non-fiction books
Literary criticism